Google Desktop was a computer program with desktop search capabilities, created by Google for Linux, Apple Mac OS X, and Microsoft Windows systems. It allowed text searches of a user's email messages, computer files, music, photos, chats, Web pages viewed, and the ability to display "Google Gadgets" on the user's desktop in a Sidebar.

In September 2011, Google announced it would discontinue a number of its products, including Google Desktop. The reason given was that "In the last few years, there’s been a huge shift from local to cloud-based storage and computing, as well as the integration of search and gadget functionality into most modern operating systems. People now have instant access to their data, whether online or offline. As this was the goal of Google Desktop, the product will be discontinued.

Features
As of January 2008, Google Desktop featured the following functionality:

Sidebar
A prominent feature of the Google Desktop is the Sidebar, which holds several common Gadgets and resides off to one side of the desktop.  The Sidebar is available on the Windows and Linux versions of Google Desktop.  The Sidebar comes pre-installed with the following gadgets:
 Email – a panel which lets one view their own Gmail messages.
 Scratch Pad – here the user can store notes; they are saved automatically
 Photos – displays a slideshow of photos from the "My Pictures" folder (address can be changed)
 News – shows the latest headlines from Google News, and how long ago they were written. The News panel is personalized depending on the type of news that users read.
 Weather – shows the current weather for a location specified by the user.
 Web Clips – shows updated content from RSS and Atom web feeds.
 Google Talk – If Google Talk is installed, double clicking the window title will dock it to the user's sidebar.

Like the Windows Taskbar, the Google Desktop sidebar can be set to Auto-Hide mode, where it will only appear once the user moves the mouse cursor towards the side where it resides. If not on auto-hide, by default the sidebar will always take up about 1/6 – 1/9 of the screen (depending on the screen resolution), and other windows are forced to resize. However, the sidebar can be resized to take less space, and users can disable the "always on top" feature in the options. With the auto-hide feature on, the sidebar temporarily overlaps  maximized windows.

Another feature that comes with the Sidebar is alerts.  When the Sidebar is minimized, new email and news can be displayed on a pop-up window above the Windows Taskbar.

Quick Find

When searching in the sidebar, deskbar or floating deskbar, Google Desktop displays a "Quick Find" window. This window is filled with six (by default) of the most relevant results from the user's computer. These results update as the user types, and allows use without having to open another browser window.

Deskbars
Deskbars are boxes which enable searching directly from the desktop. Web results will open in a browser window, and selected computer results will be displayed in the "Quick Find" box (see above). A Deskbar can either be a fixed deskbar, which sits in the Windows Taskbar, or a Floating Deskbar, which may be positioned anywhere on the desktop.

Email indexing
Google Desktop includes plugins that allow indexing and searching the contents of local Microsoft Outlook, IBM Lotus Notes, and Mozilla Thunderbird email databases, outside of the client applications' built-in search functions.  For Lotus Notes, only local databases are indexed for searching. Google Desktop's email indexing feature is also integrated with Google's web-based email service, Gmail; it can index and search the email messages in Gmail accounts.

Gadgets and plug-ins

Desktop gadgets are interactive mini-applications that can be placed anywhere on the user's desktop – or docked in the Sidebar – to show new email, weather, photos, and personalized news.  Google offers a gallery of pre-built gadgets for download on the official website.  For developers, Google offers an SDK and an official blog for anyone who wants to write gadgets or plug-ins for Google Desktop.  An automated system creates a developer hierarchy called the "Google Desktop Hall of Fame", where programmers can advance based on their gadgets' number and popularity.

The SDK also allows third-party applications to make use of the search facilities provided by Google Desktop Search. For example, the file manager Directory Opus offers integrated Google Desktop Search support.

Results list: title meta data
Even though other desktop search programs can search files meta data, Google Desktop (for Windows) is the only one that uses the "title" tag for its results lists of all files (On Linux it shows the meta-data of HTML files, but not PDF files). Other programs use the file names for their results lists.
The use of the "title" tag gives a significantly better user experience, since metadata titles (when present) are written in ordinary language, while file names are less communicative.
When the title meta data is missing from a file, Google Desktop reverts to use its filename.

Release history

Google Desktop was originally developed to bring Google search technology to the desktop.  Google Desktop received much attention because it may allow reverse engineering of Google's proprietary search algorithm.

A centrally administered version, which integrates the user experience with the vendor's appliance, exists as well.  Google Desktop was officially discontinued on September 14, 2011.

Microsoft Windows

The first release of Google Desktop Search was released as a beta version on October 14, 2004.
Version 2 was released as a beta version on August 22, 2005. The new feature that distinguishes Desktop 2 from Desktop is the addition of Sidebar, a panel that displays personalized information, which can be placed on either side of the Windows desktop and can display real-time news, e-mail, photos, stocks, and weather, among others. Sidebar includes a search box that can search just the PC or Google's other search types (like Web, Images, News, Groups.)  Google Desktop 2 graduated from beta on November 3, 2005.  New features include a sidebar plug-in for Google Maps and more plug-in developer support.
Google Desktop 3 Beta was released on February 9, 2006.  It includes support for searching multiple computers on a network. Google Desktop 3 graduated from beta on March 14, 2006.  Notable in this version is the quick search box, which appears anywhere on the desktop after pressing "control" twice.
Google Desktop 4 Beta was released on May 10, 2006.  It features Google Gadgets, modules that can deliver an array of information. It also introduces option to automatically remove deleted files from search results. Google Desktop 4 graduated from beta on June 27, 2006.
Google Desktop v4.5  was released on November 14, 2006, adding a transparency aesthetic to the sidebar and "floating" gadgets.  The graphic interface of the sidebar was also enhanced with more stylized icons for news, stocks, weather, photos, etc.  Release 4.5 also added support for Windows Vista.
Google Desktop 5 Beta was released on March 6, 2007.
 Google Desktop v 5.1 (the first post-Desktop 5 Beta release) is made available for download on April 27, 2007.
 Google Desktop v 5.5 was released on October 2, 2007.
 Google Desktop v 5.5 (5.7.0802.22438) was released February 29, 2008.
 Google Desktop v 5.5 (5.8.0806.18441) was released July 1, 2008.
 Google Desktop v 5.8 (5.8.0809.08522) was released September 11, 2008.
 Google Desktop v 5.8 (5.8.0809.23506) was released October 5, 2008.
 Google Desktop v 5.9 (5.9.0906.04286) was released July 8, 2009. It added support for the Chrome browser and is the last version mentioned in the release notes.
 Google Desktop v 5.9.0909.02235 added support for the Private Browsing features of Firefox 3 and Internet Explorer 8.
 Google Desktop v 5.9.0909.30391 has been released.
 Google Desktop v 5.9.0911.03589 has been released.
 Google Desktop v 5.9.1005.12335 was released in May 2010.
 Google Desktop was discontinued entirely on September 14, 2011.

Mac
In April 2007, Google released Desktop 1.0 for Mac OS X, which can function alongside the Spotlight search tool in Mac OS X v10.4.
On November 29, 2007, Google released Desktop v1.4.0.826 beta for Mac OS X, which plugs into Dashboard for Gadgets support.
Version 1.6 of the Mac version of Google Desktop does not function under Mac OS X Snow Leopard.

Linux
Google released Desktop 1.0 for Linux on June 27, 2007.  It currently features the basic functionality of the Windows version and the sidebar functionality.
Google added 64-bit support to the Google Desktop for Linux with version 1.1.1.0075, which was made available for download on December 18, 2007.
Google Desktop for Linux version 1.2.0.0088 was released on April 11, 2008.

Criticisms

Security
In February 2007, Yair Amit, of Watchfire, found a series of vulnerabilities in Google Desktop that could allow a malicious individual to achieve not only remote, persistent access to sensitive data, but in some cases full system control as well. The significant impact and the ease of exploitation forced Google to change some of Google Desktop's logic in Google Desktop version 5.

Privacy

Many privacy and civil liberties groups such as the Electronic Frontier Foundation (EFF) have concerns that personal information on people's computers could readily be copied from users' hard drives.

Google Desktop version 3 contains certain features that raise serious security and privacy concerns. Specifically, the share across computers feature, which introduces the ability to search content from desktop to desktop, greatly increases the risk to users' privacy.  If Google Desktop V.3 is set to allow Search Across Computers, files on an indexed computer are copied to Google's servers. The potential for information stored on their computers to be accessed by others if they enable this feature of Google Desktop v. 3 on their computers should be seriously considered. The EFF advises against using this feature.  Also, those who have confidential data on their work or home computers should not enable this feature. There are privacy laws and company policies that could be violated through the installation of this feature, specifically, SB 1386, HIPAA, FERPA, GLBA and Sarbanes-Oxley.

Other more far reaching concerns arise around the packaging and end user license agreement – specifically the level of intrusion on the local machine and the disclaimers that users implicitly agree to future changes in the license agreement without actually being able to see them immediately.

Outlook indexing
There had been some issues with Microsoft Outlook indexing.  Deleted email listings were not removed and required re-installing Google Desktop for any new archived mail to be listed. Several versions have been released to patch the Outlook indexing.

During the first half of 2009, a large number of Google Desktop users reported that the product stopped indexing suddenly, when the index file reached approximately 4GB in size.  A full uninstall (including manually deleting the indexes) and then reinstall would fix the problem temporarily, but the problem would recur when the index file reached 4GB again.  The problem has been resolved as of Google Desktop Search version 5.9.  Currently, Google Desktop does not index email or contacts in Outlook 2010.

Thunderbird indexing
By default, Google Desktop does not index email in Thunderbird 3.

See also

Alfred (Mac OS X)
Desktop search
DocFetcher (uses Java)
Copernic Desktop Search
Everything
Google Drive
Launchy
List of desktop search engines
List of Google services and tools
Quicksilver (Mac OS X)
Recoll
Windows Search (component of Windows)
AnyTXT Searcher

References

Desktop search engines
Defunct internet search engines
Desktop
MacOS Internet software
Windows Internet software
Internet software for Linux
Freeware
2004 software